Llewelyn Powys (13 August 1884 – 2 December 1939) was a British essayist, novelist and younger brother of John Cowper Powys and T. F. Powys.

Family
Powys was born in Dorchester, the son of the Reverend Charles Francis Powys (1843–1923), who was vicar of Montacute, Somerset for thirty-two years, and Mary Cowper Johnson, a granddaughter of Dr John Johnson, the cousin and friend of the poet William Cowper.

He came from a family of eleven children, many of whom were also talented. Two brothers John Cowper Powys and Theodore Francis Powys were also well-known writers, while his sister Philippa published a novel and some poetry. Another sister Marian Powys was an authority on lace and lace-making and published a book on this subject. His brother A. R. Powys was Secretary of the Society for the Protection of Ancient Buildings, and published a number of books on architectural subjects.

Life
He was educated at Sherborne School 1899–1903 and Corpus Christi College, Cambridge 1903–1906. While lecturing in the United States he contracted tuberculosis. After his return in 1909, he travelled again, living for a while in Switzerland. He spent time in Africa, farming with his brother William near Gilgil in British East Africa (now in Kenya) from 1914 to 1919.
 
In 1920 he went again to America to work as a journalist. While living in New York City he met and married, in 1924, the novelist Alyse Gregory (1884–1967), editor of the journal The Dial. In 1925 the couple moved to Dorset: firstly to the Coastguard Cottages on White Nothe and then to nearby farmhouse Chydyok, where his two sisters, the poet and novelist, Philippa Powys, and the artist, Gertrude Powys, occupied the adjacent cottage. This was close to the village of East Chaldon where his brother, the author Theodore Powys, lived from 1904 until 1940. Various other writers and artists lived in the village at different times, such as Sylvia Townsend Warner and David Garnett, the poets Valentine Ackland and Gamel Woolsey, and the sculptors Elizabeth Muntz and Stephen Tomlin.

Gamel Woolsey met John Cowper Powys when she lived in Patchin Place, Greenwich Village, and, through him, his brother Llewelyn and his wife, Alyse Gregory. She and Alyse became friends for life, while with Llewelyn she had a passionate and painful love affair. Woolsey left New York for England in 1929, settling in Dorset to be near Llewelyn, where she came to know the whole Powys family and their circle. Parting from Llewelyn in 1930, she married the historian and writer Gerald Brenan in a private ceremony, and they lived together, mainly in Spain, until her death.

Powys traveled with his wife, paying visits to Mandatory Palestine (1928), the West Indies (1930) and Switzerland (1937). He died in Clavadel, Switzerland from complications related to an ulcer.

His writings include a novel, Apples Be Ripe (1930), and a biography of Henry Hudson (1927). He was very friendly with Hamilton Rivers Pollock, Barrister, owner from 1928, of Urchfont Manor.

Rationalism
Powys identified as a rationalist and wrote articles critical of religion in freethought journals such as the Rationalist Annual and The Literary Guide.

He was an atheist.

Bibliography

Works
Confessions of Two Brothers (1916)
Ebony and Ivory (1923) short stories, sketches
Thirteen Worthies (1923) essays
Honey and Gall (1924) autobiography
Black Laughter (1925)
Cup-Bearers of Wine and Hellebore (1924)
Skin for Skin (1925) autobiography
The Verdict of Bridlegoose (1926)
Henry Hudson (1927)
Out of the Past (1928)
The Cradle of God (1929)
The Pathetic Fallacy (1930)
An Hour on Christianity (1930)
Apples Be Ripe (1930)
A Pagan's Pilgrimage (1931)
Impassioned Clay (1931)
The Life and Times of Anthony à Wood (1932)
Now That The Gods Are Dead (1932)
Glory of Life (1934)
Earth Memories (1935)
Damnable Opinions (1935)
Dorset Essays (1935)
The Twelve Months (1936)
How I Became and why I Remain a Rationalist (1937)
Somerset Essays (1937)
Rats in the Sacristy (1937)
The Book of Days (1937)
Love and Death (1939)
A Baker's Dozen (1940)
Old English Yuletide (1940)
The Letters of Llewelyn Powys (1943) edited by Louis Wilkinson
Swiss Essays (1947)
Advice to a Young Man (1949)
Llewelyn Powys: A Selection (1952) edited by Kenneth Hopkins

Critical studies
Elwin, Malcolm (1946), The Life of Llewelyn Powys
Graves, Richard Percival, The Powys Brothers (Oxford: Oxford University Press, 1984)
Ward, Richard Heron (1936), The Powys Brothers
Peter J. Foss (2007), A Bibliography of Llewelyn Powys
Wilkinson, Louis (1943), The Letters of Llewelyn Powys
Lee, Neil (2014),"Llewelyn Powys - The Man Behind the Myth" (New Age Poetry Press, 2014)

References

External links
Sundial Press 
The Powys Society 
 
 
 Manuscripts and Book Collections relating to members of the Powys family at the University of Exeter

1884 births
1939 deaths
20th-century deaths from tuberculosis
20th-century essayists
20th-century English novelists
Writers from Dorset
People educated at Sherborne School
Alumni of Corpus Christi College, Cambridge
Critics of Christianity
English atheist writers
English essayists
Freethought writers
People from Dorchester, Dorset
Rationalists
Tuberculosis deaths in Switzerland
East Africa Protectorate people
English autobiographers